A United States Uniformed Services Privilege and Identification Card (also known as U.S. military ID, Geneva Conventions Identification Card, or less commonly abbreviated USPIC) is an identity document issued by the United States Department of Defense to identify a person as a member of the Armed Forces or a member's dependent, such as a child or spouse.

The card is used to control access to military bases, Base exchange (such as AAFES, Navy Exchange, Marine Corps Exchange, Coast Guard Exchange), commissaries and Morale Welfare and Recreation (MWR) facilities. It also serves as proof of eligibility for medical care delivered either directly within the military health system or outside via TRICARE.

The modern identification card is called a Common Access Card (CAC) because it is also a smart card that is used with specialized card readers for automatic building access control systems, communications encryption, and computer access. The Common Access Card is now used by members of Active Duty, Reserves, and the National Guard.

Types
The primary types of U.S. military ID cards being issued today are the CAC, for active duty and Reserve members; the Department of Defense (DD) Form 2, for retirees; the DD Form 2765, for privileged veterans; and the DD Form 1173-1, for dependents. Until the CAC was phased in, starting in late 2003, the DD Form 2, in branch-specific variants, served as active duty members' IDs.  Prior to the October 1993 revision, the DD Form 2 form number was appended with one of five variant codes denoting branch of service (A, AF, N, MC, or CG), and the typewriter-filled blank form variants were overprinted with branch names and logos.  Current DD Forms 2 and 1173 are identical for all branches; the Defense Enrollment Eligibility Reporting System (DEERS) ID workstation prints branch-unique names and logos onto the blank form along with the holder's personal information at the time of issue.  Current DD Forms 2 and 1173 variants differ only in the color in which the blank form is printed, indicating the holder's status.  DD Forms 2 and 1173 are easily confused as they are similar in appearance and purpose, however they are two distinct forms.

Color coding 
The DD Form 2, DD Form 2765, and DD Form 1173 ID\S cards are color-coded to denote the status of the holder.  Colors include:
 Tan (DD FORM 2765) - Tan identification card recipients are afforded multiple privileges.  Recipients include gold-star (surviving) parents and dependents, Medal of Honor recipients, prisoners of war (current and former), Air Force/Army/Navy Cross recipients, and veterans who have been given a disability rating of 100% by the Department of Veterans Affairs.
 Green - Active duty (issued only when the Common Access Card is not available or when a service member is released from active duty and is placed in the Inactive Ready Reserves), depending on location; Member of Individual Ready Reserves or Inactive National Guard.
 Blue - Retired members of the U.S. Armed Forces.
 Tan (DD FORM 1173) - Dependents of active duty and retired members. The card has the same color as DD Form 2765.
 Red (DD FORM 2) - Retired members of the Reserves and National Guard under the age of 60 (Gray Area). Also issued to family members of the Reserves and National Guard not on Active Duty order for more than 30 days.

See also
 Identity documents in the United States

References

Uniformed Services Privilege and Identification Card
Identity documents of the United States